Una luz en el camino is a Mexican children's telenovela produced by Mapat L. de Zatarain for Televisa in 1998. It is an adaptation of the 1991–1992 Argentinian children's telenovela El árbol azul.

On Monday, March 30, 1998, Canal de las Estrellas started broadcasting Una luz en el camino weekdays at 4:30pm, replacing Sin ti. The last episode was broadcast on Friday, July 31, 1998, with Gotita de amor replacing it the following day.

Veronica Merchant and Guillermo Capetillo starred as protagonists, Mariana Botas starred as child protagonist, while Susana Zabaleta and Zaide Silvia Gutiérrez starred as antagonists.

Cast 
 
Guillermo Capetillo as Rodrigo González de Alba
Veronica Merchant as Marcela Villarreal
Mariana Botas as Luciana González de Alba Olvera
Susana Zabaleta as Astrid del Valle
Zaide Silvia Gutiérrez as Elodia Vidal
Ramón Abascal as Renato
Luz María Aguilar as Clara González de Alba
Marta Aura as Chole
Mario Casillas as Don Eliseo de la Garza
Eduardo Verástegui as Daniel
Eugenia Cauduro as Luisa Fernanda
Orlando Miguel as Miguel
María Marcela as Lorena
Otto Sirgo as Father Federico
Graciela Döring as Margarita
Tere López Tarín as Yolanda
Archie Lafranco as Juan Carlos
Arturo Barba as Enrique
Fernando Nesme as José Ramón
Bárbara Ferré as Mercedes
Rolando Brito as Bruno San Martín
Gretel Rocha as Paulina
Naydelin Navarrete as Vicky de los Santos
Mayte Iturralde as Lupita
Luis Fernando Madrid as Pablito
Roberto Marín as Marco
Nicky Mondellini as Victoria de de los Santos
Perla Jasso as Bertha
José Antonio Marros as Don Pablo
Gabriel Mijares as Manolo
Claudia Ortega as Hortensia
Nayeli Pellicer as Celia
Radamés de Jesús as Darío
Silvia Eugenia Derbez as Magda
Edmundo Ibarra as Germán
Patricio Castillo as Tomás
Antonio Escobar as Armando
Benjamín Islas as Ismael
Mickey Santana as Andrés
Valerie Sirgo as Ivonne
Óscar Traven as Luis Trejo
Martha Navarro as Consuelo
Andrea Legarreta as Ana Olvera de González
Marcela de Galina as María Marcela
Karla Kegel as Susana
Paola Kegel as Silvana

References

External links

1998 telenovelas
Mexican telenovelas
1998 Mexican television series debuts
1998 Mexican television series endings
Television shows set in Mexico
Televisa telenovelas
Children's telenovelas
Mexican television series based on Argentine television series
Spanish-language telenovelas